Znamensky (masculine), Znamenskaya (feminine), or Znamenskoye (neuter) may refer to:
Znamensky (surname) (Znamenskaya), Russian last name
Znamensky District, several districts in the countries of the former Soviet Union
Znamensky (rural locality) (Znamenskaya, Znamenskoye), several rural localities in Russia
Brothers Znamensky Memorial, an IAAF World Challenge meeting

See also
Znamensk, several inhabited localities in Russia